The Adriano González León Biennial Novel Prize (in Spanish, Premio Bienal de Novela Adriano González León) was established in Venezuela 2004 to recognize living novelists who are either Venezuelan nationals residing in any country or foreign nationals residing in Venezuela. The prize was named in honor of the premier living Venezuelan novelist of the time, Adriano González León (1931–2008), the author of País Portátil (1968).

Three organizations collaborated to found the prize: the national branch of the international writers' guild, PEN, the business conglomerate Grupo de Empresas Econoinvest, and the publishing company Grupo Editorial Norma. Criteria for eligibility include that the novel be written in Spanish, has never been published, has never received a literary award, and is not already entered in another literary competition.

Winners

2004 - Milton Quero Arévalo for El corrector de estilo
2006 - Héctor Bujanda for La última vez
2008 - Gustavo Valle

Notes

References
Analitica.com. 13 October 2006. Hector Bujanda Premio Adriano González León. In Spanish.
PEN de Venezuela. 2008. Web page of Venezuelan PEN with the competition rules. In Spanish.

See also
Guía de Concursos Literarios a private Web site dedicated to all literary prizes
Infolibro, a private Web page dedicated to all Venezuelan literary prizes

Venezuelan literary awards
Literary awards honoring unpublished books or writers
Awards established in 2004
2004 establishments in Venezuela